"Case" is a song by Nigerian singer Teni. Produced by Jaysynths, it was officially released on October 19, 2018. The song won Best Pop Single at The Headies 2019.

Background and composition
"Case" is a mid-tempo Afrobeats track that was produced by Jaysynths. Recorded primarily in Nigerian pidgin, its lyrics revolve around a girl going the extra mile to get the attention of her love interest. In 2019, Teni was featured on YouTube's Artist on the Rise platform. As a result of the recognition, her videos were promoted on YouTube's U.S trending page, in social media ads, and at fan event appearances.

Video and performance
The accompanying music video for "Case" was shot and directed by Director K outside Nigeria. As of November 2019, the video has surpassed 18 million views on YouTube.

In September 2019, Teni performed "Case" during an event attended by Aliko Dangote in New York. Teni also performed the song at The Headies 2019 awards ceremony. Moreover, she performed "Case" with Mike Edwards of Big Brother Naija, Season 4.

Accolades

References

2018 songs
2018 singles
Teni (singer) songs